Whitehead's lemma is a technical result in abstract algebra used in algebraic K-theory.  It states that a matrix of the form 

 

is equivalent to the identity matrix by elementary transformations (that is, transvections):

The name "Whitehead's lemma" also refers to the closely related result that the derived group of the stable general linear group is the group generated by elementary matrices. In symbols, 
.

This holds for the stable group (the direct limit of matrices of finite size) over any ring, but not in general for the unstable groups, even over a field. For instance for 
 

one has:

where Alt(3) and Sym(3) denote the alternating resp. symmetric group on 3 letters.

See also
Special linear group#Relations to other subgroups of GL(n,A)

References

Matrix theory
Lemmas in linear algebra
K-theory
Theorems in abstract algebra